Viktoria Anatolyevna Danilenko (born 10 August 1994) is a Russian trampoline gymnast. She won the gold medal in the women's tumbling competition at the 2019 Trampoline Gymnastics World Championships held in Tokyo, Japan.

At the 2018 European Trampoline Championships held in Baku, Azerbaijan, she won the bronze medal in the women's tumbling event. In the tumbling team event she won the silver medal alongside Anna Korobeynikova, Elena Krasnokutskaya and Natalia Parakhina. In the same year, she also won the bronze medal in the women's tumbling event at the 2018 Trampoline Gymnastics World Championships held in Saint Petersburg, Russia.

References

External links 
 

1994 births
Living people
Place of birth missing (living people)
Russian female trampolinists
Medalists at the Trampoline Gymnastics World Championships